In sociology, postmaterialism is the transformation of individual values from materialist, physical, and economic to new individual values of autonomy and self-expression.

The term was popularized by the political scientist Ronald Inglehart in his 1977 book The Silent Revolution, in which he discovered that the formative affluence experienced by the post-war generations was leading some of them to take their material security for granted and instead place greater importance on non-material goals such as self-expression, autonomy, freedom of speech, gender equality and environmentalism. Inglehart argued that with increasing prosperity, such postmaterial values would gradually increase in the publics of advanced industrial societies through the process of intergenerational replacement.

History
The sociological theory of postmaterialism was developed in the 1970s by Ronald Inglehart. After extensive survey research, Inglehart postulated that the Western societies under the scope of his survey were undergoing transformation of individual values, switching from materialist values, emphasizing economic and physical security, to a new set of postmaterialist values, which instead emphasized autonomy and self-expression. Inglehart argued that rising prosperity was gradually liberating the publics of advanced industrial societies from the stress of basic acquisitive or materialistic needs.

Observing that the younger people were much more likely to embrace postmaterialist values, Inglehart speculated that this silent revolution was not merely a case of a life-cycle change, with people becoming more materialist as they aged, but a genuine example of generational replacement causing intergenerational value change.

The theory of intergenerational change is based on the scarcity hypothesis and the socialization hypothesis.

Scarcity hypothesis
Inglehart assumed that individuals pursue various goals in something akin to a hierarchical order. While people may universally aspire to freedom and autonomy, the most pressing material needs like hunger, thirst and physical security have to be satisfied first, since they are immediately linked with survival. According to Inglehart's interpretation of Abraham Maslow's hierarchy of human goals, while scarcity prevails, these materialistic goals will have priority over postmaterialist goals like belonging, esteem, and aesthetic and intellectual satisfaction. However, once the satisfaction of the survival needs can be taken for granted, the focus will gradually shift to these "non-material" goods.

Socialization hypothesis
The relationship between material conditions and value priorities is not one of immediate adjustment. A large body of evidence indicates that people's basic values are largely fixed when they reach adulthood, and change relatively little thereafter. Therefore, cohorts which often experienced economic scarcity would ceteris paribus (all things being equal) place a high value on meeting economic needs (such as valuing economic growth above protecting the environment) and on safety needs (will support more authoritarian styles of leadership, will exhibit strong feelings of national pride, will be strongly in favour of maintaining a large, strong army and will be more willing to sacrifice civil liberties for the sake of law and order). On the other hand, cohorts who have experienced sustained high material affluence start to give high priority to values such as individual improvement, personal freedom, citizen input in government decisions, the ideal of a society based on humanism, and maintaining a clean and healthy environment.

Together, these two hypotheses carry the implication that, given long periods of material affluence, a growing part of society will embrace postmaterialist value systems, an implication which has been indeed borne out internationally in the past 30 years of survey data. The postmaterial orientations acquired by each cohort during socialization have been observed to remain remarkably steady over the time-frame of multiple decades, being a more stable value-system in contrast to the more volatile political and social attitudes.

Measuring postmaterialism
There are several ways of empirically measuring the spread of postmaterialism in a society. A common and relatively simple way is by creating an index from survey respondents' patterns of responses to a series of items which were designed to measure personal political priorities.

The theoretical assumptions and the empirical research connected with the concept of postmaterialism have received considerable attention and critical discussion in the human sciences. Amongst others, the validity, the stability, and the causation of postmaterialism has been doubted.

The so-called "Inglehart-index" has been included in several surveys (e.g., General Social Survey, World Values Survey, Eurobarometer, ALLBUS, Turning Points of the Life-Course). The time series in ALLBUS (German General Social Survey) is particularly comprehensive. From 1980 to 1990 the share of "pure post-materialists" increased from 13% to 31% in West Germany. After the economic and social stress caused by German reunification in 1990 it dropped to 23% in 1992 and stayed on that level afterwards. The ALLBUS sample from the less affluent population in East Germany show much lower portions of postmaterialists (1991: 15%, 1992: 10%, 1998: 12%). International data from the 2000 World Values Survey show the highest percentage of postmaterialists in Australia (35%) followed by Austria (30%), Canada (29%), Italy (28%), Argentina (25%), United States (25%), Sweden (22%), Netherlands (22%), Puerto Rico (22%) etc.

As increasing postmaterialism is based on the abundance of material possessions or resources, it should not be mixed indiscriminately with asceticism or general denial of consumption. In some way postmaterialism may be described as super-materialism. German data show that there is a tendency towards this orientation among young people, in the economically rather secure public service, and in the managerial middle class.

Recently, the issue of a "second generation of postmaterialism" appearing on the scene of worldwide civil society, to a large extent conceived as their "positive ideological embodiment", has been brought up by cultural scientist Roland Benedikter in his seven-volume book series Postmaterialismus (2001–2005).

See also

References

Footnotes

Bibliography

 
 
 
 
 
 
 
  ZA (Zentralarchiv für Empirische Sozialforschung); ZUMA (Zentrum für Umfragen, Methoden und Analysen) (2005). German General Social Survey. ALLBUS / GGSS Cumulation 1980–2004 (ZA-Study-No 4243). Electronic Codebook, integrated Data File, and Survey Description. Cologne: GESIS.

Further reading

 
 

Sociological theories
Political science theories
Cultural studies
Economic ideologies
Materialism